"Que me quiten lo bailao" (literally "Let them take away from me what I've danced", a colloquialism that means "They can't take the fun I've had away from me") is a song recorded by Spanish singer Lucía Pérez. The song was written by Rafael Artesero. It is best known as the Spanish entry at the Eurovision Song Contest 2011 in Düsseldorf, Germany. The song was chosen to be the Spanish entry through the national final Destino Eurovisión, with 68% of the total votes by the audience.

The song was released as a digital download on 25 March 2011. It is the first song released from her fifth studio album Cruzo los dedos

Background
The song was written and composed by Rafael Artesero, who had already penned the Andorran Eurovision entries of 2005 and 2006 ("La mirada interior" and "Sense tu" respectively), as well as several Spanish national final entries. The author had originally submitted the song to RTVE in English as "Weeping for Joy", but the broadcaster asked him to translate it into Spanish. The composition was one of the three songs assigned to Lucía Pérez for the final of Destino Eurovisión. In the jury vote where she was left with "Que me quiten lo bailao" out of the three songs, she admitted it was not the song she preferred for not being the style she is used to performing.

Versions
After the song was chosen to compete at Eurovision, the song was recorded in studio with new arrangements with the help of Jose María “Chema” Purón, Lucía's producer since 2002 and producer and composer of the Spanish Eurovision entries of 1995 and 2000. The song was given a different tonality with the inclusion of Galician folk instruments and some of the lyrics were modified. This version of the song also changes key towards the end, and the section where Pérez sings 'para churu churu...' was cut. The recording of an English version under the title
"I'm over the moon" was announced but did not come to fruition. The Galician language version, titled "Que me quiten o bailao", was first performed by Lucía in a special program aired on TVG on July 25, 2011 to celebrate the Day of Galician Fatherland.

Music video 
The official music video was filmed on 5 March 2011 in Sitges (Barcelona), during its renowned Carnival celebrations. Fans were invited to join the filming in disguise. The video premiered on RTVE's Eurovision website on 11 March 2011.

Eurovision Song Contest 
"Que me quiten lo bailao" was Spain's entry for the Eurovision Song Contest 2011. By representing a "big five" country, it was automatically qualified for the final on 14 May 2011. Spain was drawn into position 22 out of the 25 available spots during the running order draw. In the end the song only managed to reach the 23rd place with 50 points. Televoters liked the song better than professional jurors: if only televoting results had been considered, it would have reached 16th place, whereas it was second-to-last in the national juries' voting results.

Weekly charts

References

External links
Official music video at YouTube
Profile and lyrics at Eurovision.tv

Eurovision songs of 2011
Eurovision songs of Spain
2011 songs
Warner Music Group singles